Sir John Talbot Power, 3rd Baronet (2 May 1845 – 4 December 1901) was an Irish Liberal politician.

Talbot Power was the son of former County Wexford MP and Governor of the Bank of Ireland James Power and Jane Ann Eliza (née Talbot). In 1876, he married Frances Emma Segrave, daughter of Henry Segrave, and they had at least two children: James Douglas Talbot Power and Eileen Maréli.

Talbot Power was elected MP as a Liberal candidate for County Wexford in the 1868 general election and held the seat until 1874 when he was defeated.

Talbot Power succeeded to the peerage in 1877 upon the death of his father. In 1880, he was High Sheriff of Wexford and, upon his death, the baronetcy passed to his son.

References

1845 births
1901 deaths
Irish Liberal Party MPs
High Sheriffs of Wexford
Members of the Parliament of the United Kingdom for County Wexford constituencies (1801–1922)
UK MPs 1868–1874
Baronets in the Baronetage of the United Kingdom